In angling, casting is the act of the angler throwing the bait and hook (or a lure) out over the water, typically by slinging a fishing line manipulated by a long, elastic fishing rod. The term itself may also be used for setting out a net when artisanal fishing.

The usual technique is to quickly flick/swing the rod forward towards the water, with the inertia of the terminal tackles lagging and bending the rod backward (i.e. "loading" the rod), and then use the "springing" (elastic rebound) of the rod to "whip" and rapidly sling the line forward, which in turn will hurl out the hook.

There are several methods anglers use to attempt to cast farther, the most prominent of which is the shifting of body weight towards the front foot in synchrony to the forward swinging of the rod. That combined with using a longer rod, stopping the rod swing at 45 degrees, and using correctly weighted and more aerodynamic terminal tackles, will help anglers cast farther.

Casting techniques
Casting techniques vary with the type and style of angling involved.  Different casting techniques are also used by different anglers according to personal preferences and proficiency, and each technique is named uniquely. In the single-hand sidearm cast, the angler first points the rod towards the targeted area, and then swing it back and then quickly forward like a tennis stroke, creating a cast with a relatively flat trajectory. Drop-casting, on the other hand, is all about fast sinking, and the angler must bring the rod high before releasing the finger grip on the line and drop the cast into water with full force. The double-handed overhead cast, used more for distance, uses a kendo-like overhead swing to throw the line as far as possible.

Freshwater anglers typically use lightweight, faster-action rods and for panfishing or finesse fishing for popular mid-sized game fishes such as black bass or trout, while sturdier, heavier rods are used for larger, stronger and feistier fish.  When casting light rods, sidearm casting techniques are typically used. If more distance is needed, an overhead cast is more common. For smaller, weed-rich bodies of water (such as ponds, small rivers/creeks and wetlands), where casting accuracy is more important than distance, anglers sometimes use a swinging technique known as flipping or pitching, an elastic technique known as a slingshot cast, or a softball pitch-like technique that can make the bait/lure skim the water known as a roll cast.

Saltwater anglers usually use heavier rods and lines, as they often use baits and lures that are bigger and heavier than those used on freshwater. Heavier again are the rods and lines used in surfcasting, and specialized two-handed casting techniques are used to provide the added distances required for the baits/lures to get past the surfs and reach inshore fish feeding near the upwellings. In these casts, the angler utilizes the entire body, rather than just the arms, to deliver the momentum of the cast, which may travel many hundreds of meters/feet.

Fly fishermen use ultralight artificial flies as a lure and thus use flexible lightweight rods to cast heavy lines. The technique often involve swinging the line in circles multiple times to build up momentum, before releasing the hand hold on the line and pointing the rod towards the intended direction, so the line ends up creating a loop that propagates like a wave and carries the fly out towards the far end with great accuracy. Once on or in the water, the fly can then mimic aquatic insects or other invertebrates and attract insectivorous fish such as trout and anadromous salmon.

Casting as a sport

Casting (known as Casting Sport) is also a sport adjunct to fishing, much as shooting is to hunting. The sport is supervised by the International Casting Sport Federation (ICSF) which was founded in 1955 and as of April 2014 has member associations in 31 countries.

The ICSF sponsors tournaments and recognizes world records for accuracy and distance. This sport uses plastic weights or hookless flies, and can be held on water or on athletic fields. There are competitive divisions for almost all types of fly, fixed spool and revolving spool tackle, and competitor classes. It has been included in the World Games (see photo) and has been considered for the Olympics.

The American Casting Association held its 100th Annual Casting Championships in 2008 at the Golden Gate Angling & Casting Club.

See also
 Fly fishing
 Fly casting
 Net casting
 Reach cast
 Spey casting
 Surf fishing or beach casting

References

External links
 International Casting Sport Federation 
 American Casting Association 

Fishing techniques and methods